The Copa El Salvador 2018–19 is the sixth staging of the Copa El Salvador football tournament and the second straight edition  played since being brought back from its hiatus.

This tournament started on 13 November 2018.

Participants 
This tournament will feature all the clubs from the Salvadoran Primera División, 10 from the Segunda División, and 10 from the Tercera División.

The following 32 teams qualified for the tournament:

Round of 32

|}

First leg

Second leg

Round of 16
The Round of 16 draw took place on February 1, 2019 . The first leg took place in the first week of February and the return leg the last week of February.
Jalacatal FC, Mar y Plata and Turin FESA from Tercera División (third tier), are the lowest-ranked team still in the competition.

Qualified teams

Primera Division
Metapan (1)
FAS (1)
Santa Tecla (1)
Firpo (1)
Jocoro (1)
Alianza (1)
Audaz (1)
Sonsonate (1)
 Aguila (1)

Segunda/Tercera division
El Vencedor (2)
Once Lobos (2)
Santa Rosa (2)
Vendaval (2)
Jalacatal FC (3)
Mar y Plata  (3)
Turin FESA (3)

|}

First leg

Second leg

Quarter-final
The quarter final draw took place on March 8, 2019 . The first leg took place in the third week of March and the return leg the end of March.  Once Lobos from Segunda División (second tier), are the lowest-ranked team still in the competition.

Qualified teams

Primera Division
 Santa Tecla
 FAS
 Jocoro
 Alianza
 Audaz
 Firpo
 Aguila
Segunda Division
 Once Lobos

|}

First leg

Second leg

Semi-final
The semi final draw took place on TBD, 2019 . The first leg took place in the second week of TBD and the return leg the TBD.

|}

First leg

Second leg

Final

Top goalscorers
In bold, players that continue active in the competition.

Notes

References 

1
El Salvador